Joshua or Josh Green may refer to:

 Joshua Green (businessman) (1869–1975), prominent figure in the history of Seattle, Washington
 Joshua Green (journalist) (born 1972), American journalist and editor
 Josh Green (baseball)
 Josh Green (basketball) (born 2000), Australian basketball player
 Josh Green (footballer) (born 1992), Australian rules footballer for the Essendon Bombers
 Josh Green (ice hockey) (born 1977), Canadian ice hockey player
 Josh Green (politician) (born 1970), American politician, current governor of Hawaii
 Josh Green (racing driver) (born 2002), American racing driver

See also
Joshua Greene (disambiguation)